Mintz, Levin, Cohn, Ferris, Glovsky and Popeo, P.C. (commonly referred to as "Mintz Levin" or simply "Mintz") is a general practice, full service law firm employing approximately 550 attorneys worldwide. Its headquarters are located at One Financial Center in the Financial District of Boston. The firm also has offices in London, Los Angeles, New York City, Palo Alto, San Diego, San Francisco, and Washington D.C., and a liaison office in Israel. It was founded in 1933 by Haskell Cohn and Benjamin Levin. The firm's current managing member is Robert I. Bodian.

History
Mintz Levin was founded in 1933, in the midst of the great depression, by Benjamin Levin and Haskell Cohn, who first met as classmates at Harvard Law School. The firm began practicing under the name Mintz, Levin and Cohn after Herman Mintz became a legal collaborator in 1937, and then a partner in 1939. The firm grew steadily, adding additional partners starting with William M. Glovsky in 1965. In 1968, Robert Popeo became the first attorney to join as a partner. In 1979, the firm began expanding, opening a secondary office in Washington, D.C., headed by Charles D. Ferris, former Chairman of the Federal Communications Commission (FCC). After 2000, the firm expanded further, with Mintz Levin opening offices on the West Coast and the U.K., and a liaison office in Israel.

Awards and rankings
Best Lawyers and U.S. News & World Report ranked Mintz Levin in its first annual Best Law Firms list. In 2010, the American Bar Association awarded the firm its Pro Bono Publico Award for its efforts in securing passage of legislation in Massachusetts to allow victims of sexual assault, stalking, and harassment to obtain criminally enforceable protection. The firm has received a perfect score on the Human Rights Campaign Foundation’s Corporate Equality Index for four consecutive years starting in 2008. Yale Law Women named Mintz Levin one of the nation's Top-Ten Family Friendly Firms. There are 43 Mintz Levin attorneys included in The Best Lawyers in America, 2012 Edition, and 34 Mintz Levin attorneys listed in the 2011 edition of Chambers USA.

Pro bono
Mintz Levin's attorneys represent a wide variety of nonprofit organizations and devote pro bono hours in the service of many different causes—such as human rights, civil rights, natural disaster legal assistance. In 1989, the firm established a Domestic Violence Project, which has since become its signature pro bono initiative. Hundreds of individual domestic violence and sexual assault victims have received representation through this program, which was expanded to include assisting with state and national legislative initiatives, drafting appellate and amicus efforts, and representing coalitions and related nonprofits. The firm also contributes staff time to community service on behalf of, and makes significant monetary donations to, a number of domestic violence and sexual assault causes.

References

External links
web site

Law firms based in Boston
Law firms established in 1933
Mintz Levin
1933 establishments in Massachusetts